Gorenji Podboršt is a settlement in the Municipality of Mirna Peč in southeastern Slovenia. It lies on the right bank of the Temenica River just south of Mirna Peč itself. The area is part of the historical region of Lower Carniola and is now included in the Southeast Slovenia Statistical Region.

References

External links
Gorenji Podboršt on Geopedia

Populated places in the Municipality of Mirna Peč